Joseph Hekekyan Bey (1807, Istanbul – 1874), was an Armenian administrator, archaeologist and civil engineer, who lived most of his life in Egypt.

Early life and education 
Joseph Hekekyan was born in 1807 in Constantinople and raised as an Armenian Catholic family. His father, Michirdiz H., was an interpreter for Mohamed Ali Pasha, and in 1817 was able to get him a state-sponsored scholarship to Stonyhurst College in Lancashire, England where he did various technical trades. There he studied English and Latin, after which he studied civil engineering and hydraulics until he was called to Egypt in 1830.

Surveyor and planner 
Between 1833 and 1840 he was the director of the Polytechnic School in Cairo. In the 1840s, he was tasked by the government with designing and building a number of model villages on the estates of the royal family which like the example of the village of Gezayye were arranged on a street grid by order of importance, starting with the owner’s Manor house and diwan/duwwar overlooking the road, and then rows of “well to do” sheikhs and merchants’ houses, followed by rows of “middling fellahs’” houses, and then huts for a “low class” of fellahs. In between the Manor house and the other houses, was a row of commercial buildings; shops, a mosque, an inn, and a house of prostitution. Hekekyan imported the concept of model villages from Britain where he was educated, to Egypt, and it became widely established by the late nineteenth century.These model villages launched the paradigm of patronising top-down housing for the masses knows as 'izbas.

Archaeologist 
Hekekyan directed excavations at the ruins of Memphis in Mit Rahina, Giza in 1852 and 1854, financed by the Egyptian government. These excavations were more geological than archaeological, but they were crucial for the history of Memphis and were without doubt the first "stratified" excavations carried out in Egypt.

Writings 

 Notes on the Eastern desert of Egypt, from Gebel Afret, by the ancient porphyry quarries of Gebel Khan, Near to the old station of Gebel Gir - with a brief account of the ruins at Gebel Khan - by Hekekyan bey - Journal of the Asiatic Society of Bengal, November 1848, pp 584-587
 A treatise on the chronology of siriardic monuments demonstrated that the Egyptian dynasties of Manetho are records of astrological Nile observations which have been continued to the present time, by Hekekyan Bey C.E. of Constantinople - formely in the Egyptian service (for private circulation) London, printed by Taglar and Francis 1863, I vol, 160 pp
 Hekekyan, “Journals 1851 - 1854, Folio 355, British Library Add Ms. 37448-71.
 Joseph Hekekyan Bey, Collections. The British Museum.

Further reading 
 Ahmed Abdelrehim Moustafa, "'Asr Hekekyan".Cairo: General  Egyptian Book Organisation. 1990.
 Darrell I. Dykstra, Joseph Hekekyan and the Egyptian School in Paris, The Armenian Review (Boston, USA), 1982 N#35, pp 165-182
 List of Egyptian Architects

References 

1807 births
1874 deaths
Armenian archaeologists